Arthur Osmond Hewitson (27 February 1893 – 4 November 1956) was an Australian rules footballer who played for the Geelong Football Club in the Victorian Football League (VFL).

Notes

External links 

1893 births
1956 deaths
Australian rules footballers from Victoria (Australia)
Geelong Football Club players